Kishor Rahtna Rai (born 5 November 1964) is an Indian alpine skier. He competed in the men's slalom at the 1988 Winter Olympics.

Alpine skiing results

Olympic results

References

External links
 

1964 births
Living people
Indian male alpine skiers
Olympic alpine skiers of India
Alpine skiers at the 1988 Winter Olympics
Place of birth missing (living people)